Naevolus is a genus of skipper butterflies in the family Hesperiidae.

Species
Recognised species in the genus Naevolus include:
 Naevolus brunnescens (Hayward, 1939)
 Naevolus naevus Evans, 1955
 Naevolus orius Mabille, 1939

References

Natural History Museum Lepidoptera genus database

Hesperiinae
Monotypic butterfly genera
Hesperiidae genera